South Ural State Humanitarian Pedagogical University is a university in Chelyabinsk, Russia. The second oldest university in the region, it was established in 1934.

External links
 

Universities in Chelyabinsk Oblast
Chelyabinsk
Educational institutions established in 1934
Buildings and structures in Chelyabinsk Oblast
1934 establishments in Russia
Teachers colleges in Russia
Universities and institutes established in the Soviet Union